Guardiola angustifolia is a rare North American species of plants in the family Asteraceae. It is found only in western Mexico in the state of Jalisco.

Flower heads are arranged in flat-topped arrays resembling umbels at first glance. Heads have both ray flowers and disc flowers.

References

External links
Photo of herbarium specimen at Missouri Botanical Garden, collected in Jalisco in 1886

angustifolia
Flora of Jalisco
Plants described in 1899